School for Love (Futures vedettes) is a French drama film from 1955 directed by Marc Allégret, written by Marc Allégret and starring Brigitte Bardot and Jean Marais. The screenplay was based on a novel by Vicki Baum.

The film was known under the titles Joy of Living or School for Love in the U.S., Sweet Sixteen in the U.K. and Reif auf jungen Blüten in West Germany.

Plot
Tenor Eric Walter is a teacher at a Vienna conservatory who is separated from his wife, opera singer Marie. When he begins seeing one of the students, Sophie, another student named Elisa becomes jealous.

Cast
 Jean Marais as Éric Walter
 Brigitte Bardot as Sophie
 Isabelle Pia as Élis (Élisa)
 Yves Robert as Clément
 Denise Noël as Marie Koukowska-Walter
 Mischa Auer (crédité Misha Auer) as Berger
 Lila Kedrova as la mère de Sophie
 Edmond Beauchamp as le père d’Élis
 Yvette Etiévant as la mère d’Élis
 Georges Reich as Dick
 Anne Colette as Marion
 Odile Rodin as Erika
 Mylène Demongeot as The vocalist

Reception
The film performed poorly at the French box office, with only 949,416 admissions.

References

External links 
 
 Future Vendettes at TCMDB
 
 Future Vendettes at BFI
 Futures vedettes (1955) at the Films de France

1955 films
1955 romantic drama films
French romantic drama films
1950s French-language films
Films directed by Marc Allégret
French black-and-white films
Films based on Austrian novels
Films set in Vienna
1950s French films